José Luis Muñoz León (born 23 February 1997) is a Spanish professional footballer who plays for Spanish club Málaga CF as either a central defender or a defensive midfielder.

Club career
Born in Málaga, Andalusia, Muñoz joined Málaga CF's youth setup in 2010, after representing 26 de Febrero CD (two stints), CD Puerto Malagueño Guimbarda Iberia and La Mosca UD. 

He made his senior debut with the reserves on 20 September 2015, playing the full 90 minutes in a 2–2 Tercera División away draw against Loja CD.

On 26 September 2016, Muñoz signed his first professional contract running until 2020. On 16 October he scored his first senior goal, netting his team's sixth through a penalty in a 7–0 home routing of Alhaurín de la Torre CF.

Muñoz made his first team – and La Liga – debut on 21 November 2016, coming on as a second half substitute for fellow youth graduate Javier Ontiveros in a 0–0 away against FC Barcelona. 

The following 29 August, he was loaned to Segunda División side CD Lugo for one year.

On 14 August 2018, Muñoz was loaned to Córdoba CF in the second division, for one year. Upon returning, he started to feature regularly with the Blanquiazules, signing a professional two-year contract on 1 October 2020.

References

External links
Málaga profile

Living people
1997 births
Footballers from Málaga
Spanish footballers
Association football defenders
Association football midfielders
Association football utility players
La Liga players
Tercera División players
Atlético Malagueño players
Málaga CF players
CD Lugo players
Córdoba CF players
Spain youth international footballers